Samodurovka is a rural locality (a selo) and the administrative center of Samodurvskoye Rural Settlement, Povorinsky District, Voronezh Oblast, Russia. The population was 666 as of 2010. There are 5 streets.

Geography 
Samodurovka is located 12 km east of Povorino (the district's administrative centre) by road. Mokhovoye is the nearest rural locality.

References 

Rural localities in Povorinsky District